The finals and the qualifying heats of the men's 200 metre breaststroke event at the 1998 World Aquatics Championships were held on Friday 1998-01-16 in Perth, Western Australia.

A Final

B Final

Qualifying heats

Remarks

See also
1996 Men's Olympic Games 200m Breaststroke (Atlanta)
1997 Men's World SC Championships 200m Breaststroke (Gothenburg)
1997 Men's European LC Championships 200m Breaststroke (Seville)
2000 Men's Olympic Games 200m Breaststroke (Sydney)

References

Swimming at the 1998 World Aquatics Championships